The 2011–12 Chattanooga Mocs basketball team represents University of Tennessee at Chattanooga in the 2011–12 NCAA Division I men's basketball season. Their head coach is John Shulman. The Mocs play their home games at the McKenzie Arena.

Roster

Source:  Chattanooga Men's Basketball Roster

Schedule

|-
!colspan=9| Exhibition

|-
!colspan=9| Regular season

|-
!colspan=9| SoCon tournament

Source:  2011–12 Chattanooga Men's Basketball Schedule

References

Chattanooga Mocs
Chattanooga Mocs men's basketball seasons
Chattanooga Mocs
Chattanooga Mocs